This article lists a selection of notable works created by Paul Signac. The listing follows the 2001 book Signac 1863-1935: Master Neo-Impressionist. The collection of paintings by Paul Signac on the French website vasari.fr with its assigned titles, years and catalogue numbers from the catalogue raisonée by Francoise Cachin is used in addition.

Paintings

Museums
Albertina, Vienna
Alte Nationalgalerie, Berlin
Amos Rex, Helsinki
Artizon Museum, Tokyo	
Art Institute of Chicago
Asahi Breweries
Baltimore Museum of Art
Carnegie Museum of Art, Pittsburgh, PA
Chrysler Museum of Art, Norfolk, Virginia
Courtauld Gallery, London
Dallas Museum of Art
Dixon Gallery and Gardens, Memphis, Tennessee
Fondation Bemberg, Toulouse
Finnish National Gallery, Helsinki
Fondation Pierre Gianadda, Martigny, Switzerland
Foundation E. G. Bührle
Guggenheim Museum Bilbao
Hermitage Museum, Saint Petersburg
Hiroshima Museum of Art
Indianapolis Museum of Art
Israel Museum, Jerusalem
Johannesburg Art Gallery
Kasser Mochary Art Foundation, Montclair
Kelvingrove Art Gallery and Museum, Glasgow
Kröller-Müller Museum, Otterlo
Kunstmuseum Basel
Kunstmuseum Den Haag
Kunsthaus Zürich
Landesmuseum Hannover
Leeds Art Gallery
Matsuoka Museum of Art, Tokyo, Japan
Metropolitan Museum of Art, New York City
Minneapolis Institute of Art
Minnesota Marine Art Museum, Winona
Miyazaki Prefectural Art Museum
Modern Gallery, Saarbrücken
Montreal Museum of Fine Arts
Musée Cantini, Marseilles
Musée Carnavalet, Paris
Musée d'Arts de Nantes
Musée d'Histoire de Saint-Malo
Musée des beaux-arts de Liège (in French)
Musée des beaux-arts de Marseille
Musée d'Orsay, Paris
Musée de l'Annonciade, Saint-Tropez (in French)
Musée Jacquemart-André, Paris
Musée Thomas-Henry, Cherbourg-en-Cotentin
Museum Barberini, Potsdam
Museum Boijmans Van Beuningen, Rotterdam
Museum Folkwang, Essen
Museum of Art in Łódź
Museum of Fine Arts, Boston
Museum of Fine Arts, Houston
Museum of Grenoble
Museum of Modern Art, New York City
Museum of Modern Art, Saitama (in Japanese)
National Gallery of Ireland, Dublin
National Gallery of Victoria, Melbourne
National Gallery Prague
National Museum of Art of Romania, Bucharest
National Museum of Serbia, Belgrade
National Museum of Western Art, Tokyo
National Museum, Warsaw
Nelson-Atkins Museum of Art, Kansas City
Norton Simon Museum, Pasadena, CA
Ny Carlsberg Glyptotek, Copenhagen
Ohara Museum of Art, Kurashiki, Japan
Paul G. Allen Collection, Seattle (in French)
Pola Museum of Art, Hakone, Japan
Pushkin Museum, Moscow
Rosengart Collection Museum, Luzern
Royal Museums of Fine Arts of Belgium, Brussels
Shimane Art Museum, Matsue, Japan
Staatsgalerie Stuttgart
Strasbourg Museum of Modern and Contemporary Art
Tel Aviv Museum of Art
Town hall of Montreuil, Seine-Saint-Denis
Thyssen-Bornemisza Museum, Madrid
Toledo Museum of Art
Van Gogh Museum, Amsterdam
Von der Heydt Museum, Wuppertal
Wallraf-Richartz-Museum, Cologne
Worcester Art Museum

See also
 Cassis, Cap Lombard, Opus 196 (1889)
 Opus 217. Against the Enamel of a Background Rhythmic with Beats and Angles, Tones, and Tints, Portrait of M. Félix Fénéon in 1890 (1890)
 Capo di Noli (1898)
 Entrance to the Grand Canal (1905)
 The Lagoon of Saint Mark, Venice (1905)
 Le Sentier des Douanes (1905)
 The Port of Marseille (1907)

Notes

References

External links

Further reading

Signac
Signac
Signac